Alec Tod (2 May 1898 – 17 November 1977) was a British equestrian. He competed in two events at the 1924 Summer Olympics.

References

External links
 

1898 births
1977 deaths
British male equestrians
Olympic equestrians of Great Britain
Equestrians at the 1924 Summer Olympics
People from Sherborne
Sportspeople from Dorset